This article is about the particular significance of the year 1945 to Wales and its people.

Incumbents
Archbishop of Wales – David Prosser, Bishop of St David's
Archdruid of the National Eisteddfod of Wales – Crwys

Events
1 January – Three months before his death, former prime minister David Lloyd George is created Earl Lloyd George of Dwyfor and Viscount Gwynedd. He never takes his seat in the House of Lords.
18 January – Winds of 113 mph are recorded at St. Ann's Head Lighthouse, Pembrokeshire.
7 March – German submarine U-1302 is sunk off St David's Head.
10 March – Sixty-seven German prisoners of war tunnel their way out of Island Farm Camp 198 at Bridgend, the biggest escape attempt by German POWs in the UK during the Second World War.
15 April – Brigadier Glyn Hughes leads the 11th Armoured Division in the liberation of Bergen-Belsen concentration camp.
April – German submarines U-242 and U-325 are sunk off The Skerries.
15 May – At the Neath by-election, a Trotskyist candidate contests the constituency, the first time in any UK election.
5 July – In the United Kingdom general election:
For the last time in a General Election, a candidate in Wales is elected unopposed — Will John, Labour MP for Rhondda West.
Ambrose Bebb stands as a Plaid Cymru Parliamentary candidate.
Hugh Dalton becomes the new Chancellor of the Exchequer.
W. J. Gruffydd retains the University of Wales seat for the Liberals, the last time it will be contested before abolition.
27 July – The cause of an outbreak of typhoid in Aberystwyth is traced to locally-made ice cream.
2 August – Clement Davies becomes leader of the Liberal Party.
12 September – Newspaper publisher Gomer Berry is created Viscount Kemsley.
8 October – Rudolf Hess is flown to Nuremberg to stand trial, ending his three-year internment at Maindiff Court Military Hospital, Abergavenny.
October – Stocks of captured Nazi German bombs filled with Tabun (nerve agent) begin to be transferred to the RAF ammunition store near Llanberis.
13 November – Explorer Edward Evans is created Baron Mountevans.
date unknown
Closure of the Benallt manganese mine, near Aberdaron.
Broadcaster Wynford Vaughan-Thomas is awarded the Croix de Guerre for his exploits in following the invading troops into France during 1944.
Kayser Bondor open an underwear factory at Pentrebach.

Arts and literature

Awards

National Eisteddfod of Wales (held in Rhosllanerchrugog)
National Eisteddfod of Wales: Chair – Tom Parri Jones
National Eisteddfod of Wales: Crown – withheld
National Eisteddfod of Wales: Prose Medal – withheld

New books
Idris Davies – Tonypandy and other poems
D. Gwenallt Jones – Detholiad o Ryddiaith Gymraeg R. J. Derfel
Huw Menai – The Simple Vision

Music
National Youth Orchestra of Wales formed, the world's first such organisation.
Ivor Novello – Perchance to Dream
Mansel Thomas – "Y Bardd"

Film
Ray Milland wins an Academy Award for Best Actor for his role in The Lost Weekend.

Broadcasting
The BBC issues the first Welsh edition of Radio Times.

Sport
Football – The first post-war match between Wales and England ends in a 1 – 0 victory for Wales.

Births

6 January – Barry John, rugby player
7 February – Gerald Davies, rugby player
12 February – Gareth Thomas, actor (died 2016)
19 February – Huw Llywelyn Davies, broadcaster
3 April – Gary Sprake, footballer (died 2016)
7 April – Martyn Lewis, TV journalist
2 May – Eddie Avoth, boxing champion
8 May – Mike German AM, politician
9 May – Malcolm Nash, cricketer (died 2019)
15 July – Rachel Lomax, economist
13 August – Howard Marks, drug trafficker (died 2016)
29 August (in Cromford) – Sue Essex AM, politician
7 September – Max Boyce, entertainer
15 September – Clive Merrison, actor
30 November – Roger Glover, musician
21 December – Alan Williams MP, politician
date unknown – Lyn Evans, physicist

Deaths
3 January
 Edward Peake, Wales international rugby union player, 84
 Sir William James Thomas, 1st Baronet, industrialist, 77
9 January – Dennis O'Neill, murder victim, 12
11 January – Caradoc Evans, author, 66
16 January – Robert Griffith Berry, Congregationalist minister and writer, 75

17 January – Reginald Clarry MP, politician, 62
6 February – Edward Prosser Rhys, journalist and poet, 43
17 March – Sir Thomas Lewis, cardiologist, 63
26 March – David Lloyd George  MP, politician, 82
12 May (in Brighton) – James Walker, MP for Newport (1929–31), 61 (in a road accident) 
16 May – Harry Vaughan Watkins, Wales international rugby player, 69
11 June – Owen Evans  MP, politician, 69
14 June – John Hugh Edwards, MP, 76
22 June – William Williams, Wales national rugby union player, 78
29 July – Cecil Griffiths, athlete, 44 (heart attack)
29 September – Evan James Williams, physicist, 42 (cancer)
15 November – John Lloyd Williams, botanist, 91
21 November – Thomas Rhondda Williams, Congregational minister and politician, 84/5
1 December – Tom Graham, Wales international rugby player
26 December – George Travers, Wales international rugby union player, 68
date unknown – Len Davies, footballer

References

See also
1945 in Northern Ireland